Heartbeat is the fourth studio album by Australian country music singer Jasmine Rae. The album was released on 5 May 2015. The album includes the singles "Heartbeat" and "When I Found You", both of which charted on the Australian Country Airplay charts. "Eggs in a Basket" was released in 2016 and "Everybody Wants to Take My Money" was released as the album's third single in 2017.

Reception

Jamie Parmenter from Renowned for Sound commented on the "different qualities to the record" which are "all wrapped neatly in a country bow". Parmenter said "Having penned 10 out of the 12 tracks... [Rae has] created a well-structured and meaningful record". Mallory Arbour from The AU Review said "Heartbeat showcases Jasmine's stunning vocals and versatility as a artist, which makes her a force to be reckoned with in the industry and one to watch out for in the future." adding "It's an honest album that is guaranteed to please fans and gain her many more. I'm a big believer that there is no such thing as perfection, but it comes pretty damn close!"

Track listing

Charts

Weekly charts

Year-end charts

Release history

References

Jasmine Rae albums
2015 albums